The stripesnout false moray (Chlopsis apterus) is an eel in the family Chlopsidae. It was described by William Beebe and John Tee-Van in 1938, originally under the genus Arenichthys. It is a tropical, marine eel which is known from the eastern Pacific Ocean. It generally dwells at a depth around 82 m.

The stripesnout false moray is listed as Least concern by the IUCN redlist, due to its wide distribution, lack of threats, and lack of population decline.

References

Chlopsidae
Fish described in 1938
Taxa named by William Beebe
Taxa named by John Tee-Van